Tom Atkins (born 18 September 1995) is an Australian rules footballer playing for  in the Australian Football League (AFL). An inside midfielder with goalkicking ability, he spent his early career with Geelong's Victorian Football League (VFL) affiliate. After being overlooked in two AFL drafts, he was selected by Geelong with pick 11 in the 2019 rookie draft and made his debut in the opening round of the 2019 season.

Early career 
Atkins began playing in the VFL with Geelong in 2014. He spent his first year on the club's development list before playing VFL matches under the 23rd-player rule (which permitted teams to be expanded to allow players recently listed with a TAC Cup club to play with its VFL affiliate). In 2015, Atkins played for St Joseph's in the Geelong Football League, assisting in their first premiership victory since 1989. In the VFL, he played only ten games from 2014 to 2015, but became an important inside midfielder for Geelong in 2016 after others left the club or were injured. Atkins kicked 15 goals and averaged eight tackles, 18 disposals and four clearances per match, winning Geelong's best and fairest with 389 votes. He was also named in the VFL team of the year in the forward pocket and was considered by Fox Sports one of 15 VFL prospects likely to be selected in the 2016 AFL draft. Atkins' strong season attracted interest from interstate clubs but he stayed with Geelong.

In 2017, Atkins was Geelong's co-captain and became a permanent midfielder, but his season was interrupted by a hamstring injury causing him to miss six games. When uninjured he was still regularly named among Geelong's best and in round 18 laid 23 tackles against Collingwood, including 12 in the last quarter – the equal-most in a VFL match and the equal-second-most recorded by Champion Data in any competition. Atkins also kicked two goals and amassed 25 disposals to perform best on ground. He was again named, this time by ESPN, as a strong mature-age player likely to be drafted.

Atkins again missed out on selection in the 2017 draft, but was encouraged by Geelong's head of football Simon Lloyd to continue pushing for an AFL career. He was named Geelong's sole VFL captain and played every game in the 2018 season, with career-high averages of 21.8 disposals and 9.4 tackles. Atkins was among the VFL's top ten players in score assists, handballs, contested possessions, clearances and hard ball gets. He led the competition in tackles, recording 188, and captained the VFL team of the year as a rover. Atkins won his second Geelong best and fairest with 413 votes. He was named by AFL.com.au as among the best mature-age players ahead of the 2018 draft.

AFL career 
Atkins was selected by Geelong with pick 11 in the 2019 AFL rookie draft and cited as "another graduate of the Geelong VFL production line" alongside other AFL-listed players such as Tom Stewart, Scott Thompson and Shane Mumford. He anticipated playing primarily as a small forward rather than an inside midfielder as he had done in the VFL, due to Geelong's abundance of high-quality midfielders. Atkins made his debut in the opening round of the 2019 season against  at the Melbourne Cricket Ground.

During his first two seasons, Atkins was most used as a pressure forward by Geelong coach Chris Scott, switching to defence during the 2021 AFL season. He would take an opportunity to move into the Geelong midfield during the 2022 AFL season, with his tenacity and pressure often setting the tone for his teammates to follow. Atkins would play a key role in Geelong's 2022 success, with the club winning the 2022 AFL Grand Final. Atkins would finish fifth in the club's Carji Greeves Medal count, winning the Tom Harley Award as best clubman for 2022.

Statistics
Updated to the end of the 2022 season.

|-
| 2019 ||  || 30
| 23 || 5 || 4 || 122 || 162 || 284 || 36 || 110 || 0.2 || 0.2 || 5.3 || 7.0 || 12.3 || 1.6 || 4.8
|-
| 2020 ||  || 30
| 12 || 4 || 1 || 43 || 74 || 117 || 11 || 38 || 0.3 || 0.1 || 3.6 || 6.2 || 9.8 || 0.9 || 3.2
|-
| 2021 ||  || 30
| 22 || 0 || 1 || 207 || 169 || 376 || 84 || 75 || 0.0 || 0.1 || 9.4 || 7.7 || 17.1 || 3.8 || 3.4
|-
| scope=row bgcolor=F0E68C | 2022# ||  || 30
| 25 || 4 || 3 || 238 || 214 || 452 || 65 || 157 || 0.2 || 0.1 || 9.5 || 8.6 || 18.1 || 2.6 || 6.3
|- class=sortbottom
! colspan=3 | Career
! 82
! 13
! 9
! 610
! 619
! 1229
! 196
! 380
! 0.2
! 0.1
! 7.4
! 7.5
! 15.0
! 2.4
! 4.6
|}

Notes

Honours and achievements
Team
 AFL premiership player: 2022
 2× McClelland Trophy: 2019, 2022

Individual
Geelong F.C. Tom Harley Award for Best Clubman: 2022
2× Geelong F.C. VFL Best & Fairest: 2016, 2018

References

External links 

Living people
1995 births
Australian rules footballers from Victoria (Australia)
Geelong Football Club players
Geelong Football Club Premiership players
People educated at Geelong College
One-time VFL/AFL Premiership players